Kowloon East Community is a localist political group formed in late 2014 in Hong Kong by a group of netizens on the online forum Hong Kong Golden Forum who were inspired by 2014 Occupy protests. It focuses on livelihood issues in Kwun Tong District and won a seat in the 2015 Hong Kong district council elections.

Performance in elections

Legislative Council elections

District Council elections

See also
 Youngspiration
 Tin Shui Wai New Force
 Sha Tin Community Network

References

External links
Official website

2014 establishments in Hong Kong
Political organisations based in Hong Kong
Localist parties in Hong Kong